Better Homes and Gardens Real Estate LLC is an international real estate company which began operations in July 2008.

Better Homes and Gardens Real Estate franchises independent businesses to operate within its network.

Brand History 
In 1978, Meredith Corporation, one of the nation’s leading media and marketing companies and publisher of Better Homes and Gardens magazine, launched the former Better Homes and Gardens Real Estate Service. Meredith owned and operated Better Homes and Gardens Real Estate Service from 1978 to 1998. Meredith then sold the real estate business in 1998 to GMAC Home Services Inc., a subsidiary of GMAC Financial Services, while retaining the Better Homes and Gardens name. GMAC was given the right to use the Better Homes and Gardens Real Estate Service name for up to 10 years after the sale, after which it was phased out.

In October 2007, Meredith Corporation granted Realogy Holdings Corp. the right to license the Better Homes and Gardens name and related trademarks for 100 years. Realogy re-launched the Better Homes and Gardens franchise network on July 1, 2008 and named Sherry Chris, then COO of Coldwell Banker, CEO and president of the newly launched company.  Better Homes and Gardens Real Estate became the fifth residential real estate brand launched by Realogy. In 2022, Realogy rebranded as Anywhere Real Estate, Inc.

Affiliates 
The Better Homes and Gardens Real Estate network is composed of independently owned and operated franchises. The network includes several large companies.

The network has grown substantially since its reintroduction in 2008 and expanded into Canada in 2011. Better Homes and Gardens Real Estate's corporate offices are based in Madison, New Jersey. Today, the franchise has hundreds of offices and thousands of affiliated real estate agents located throughout the U.S., Canada and Australia.

References

External links
 Web site

 Australian Web site

Real estate companies established in 2008
Real estate services companies of the United States
Realogy brands
Companies based in New Jersey
Companies based in Morris County, New Jersey